Introduction and Variations on a Theme by Mozart, Op. 9, is one of Fernando Sor's most famous works for guitar.  It was first published in London in 1821 and dedicated to Sor's brother Carlos.

Editions

The title page of the first edition reads “As performed by the author, at the Nobilities’ Concerts.” The French edition was published by Meissonnier, dated roughly in the same period, and had one less variation, no coda, and some differing notes. It is thought that this version could have been a simplification of the original work. However, in 1826 or 27, Meissonnier brought out another version, this one identical to the London first edition.

The piece

This piece embodies Fernando Sor's best characteristics as a composer, requiring great technique. It is a relatively frequently performed piece that serves as a “testing ground for every aspiring guitarist.”  As said of this piece and Op.7, the Folies d’Espagne, by Brian Jeffrey, author of the largest Sor biography to date, “no space is wasted and the music devotes itself not to “guitaristic” effects but only to itself.” 

The work is based on a melody from Mozart's opera The Magic Flute.  The opera was first performed in Vienna, 1791, and in German, while the first performances in Italian took place in 1794, so Sor could have feasibly written the piece any time since then. However, it is more likely that he was inspired to write the piece when the first major production was premiered in England in May 1819, when Sor was in the area.

The theme and the variations are based on this one that was used in numerous composer's arrangements, some being by the flutist Drouet, by Henri Herz, and by Mikhail Glinka. It is the theme played near the end of Act I as Papageno charms the slaves of Sarastro with his magic chimes. The theme is called “Das klinget so herrlich”, in Italian either translating to "O dolce concento", "O dolce armonia", or, as Sor chose to use, "O cara armonia". This last translation was also used in the vocal score of The Magic Flute published in Birchall, London in around 1813.

Sor's theme differs somewhat from Mozart's original, as may be seen in the comparison above/right. The time and key signatures of the originals have been changed and repeats deleted to better make the comparison. None of the bars (measures) are exactly the same but most only differ slightly.

Bibliography

Moser, Wolf. “Fernando Sor: The Life and Works of a Reluctant Guitarist, Part One.” Classical Guitar Magazine 26 No. 3 November 2007: 20 – 25.
John Duarte. Liner notes: Music of Spain: The Classical Heritage. Julian Bream edition, volume 24. New York, 1993.
John Duarte. Liner notes: Music of Spain: Guitarra. Julian Bream edition volume 27, New York 1993.
Buch, David J. “Two Likely Sources for Sor’s variations on a theme by Mozart, op. 9.” Guitar Review 52, Winter 1983: 6-9.
Jeffrey, Brian. Fernando Sor: Composer and Guitarist.  England, Tecla 1977.
Williams, John. Liner notes: John Williams: Guitar Recital. London, 1972.

See also
 List of variations on a theme by another composer

References

External links

Compositions for guitar
Mozart
1821 compositions
Compositions by Fernando Sor
Composer tributes (classical music)